Nikatenna may refer to:

 Nikatenna (7°19'N 80°28'E), a village in Sri Lanka
 Nikatenna (7°19'N 80°37'E), a village in Sri Lanka
 Nikatenna (7°22'N 80°31'E), a village in Sri Lanka